Bottled gas is a term used for substances which are gaseous at standard temperature and pressure (STP) and have been compressed and stored in carbon steel, stainless steel, aluminum, or composite bottles known as gas cylinders.

Gas state in cylinders
There are four cases: either the substance remains a gas at standard temperature but increased pressure, the substance liquefies at standard temperature but increased pressure, the substance is dissolved in a solvent, or the substance is liquefied at reduced temperature and increased pressure. In the last case the bottle is constructed with an inner and outer shell separated by a vacuum (dewar flask) so that the low temperature can be maintained by evaporative cooling.

Case I
The substance remains a gas at standard temperature and increased pressure, its critical temperature being below standard temperature.  Examples include:
 air
 argon
 fluorine
 helium
 hydrogen
 krypton
 nitrogen
 oxygen

Case II
The substance liquefies at standard temperature but increased pressure.  Examples include:
 ammonia
 butane
 carbon dioxide (also packaged as a cryogenic gas, Case IV)
 chlorine
 nitrous oxide
 propane
 sulfur dioxide

Case III
The substance is dissolved at standard temperature in a solvent.  Examples include:
 carbon dioxide in the form of a soft drink
 sulfur trioxide in the form of fuming sulfuric acid
 nitrogen dioxide in the form of red fuming nitric acid
 hydrogen chloride in the form of muriatic acid
 Note: these four are most often found in containers other than metal bottles, and at low pressure, e.g. .
 acetylene
 Note: Acetylene cylinders contain an inert packing material, which may be agamassan, and are filled with a solvent such as acetone or dimethylformamide.  The acetylene is pumped into the cylinder and it dissolves in the solvent.  When the cylinder is opened the acetylene comes back out of solution, much like a carbonated beverage bubbles when opened. This is a workaround to acetylene's propensity to explode when pressurized above 200 kPa or liquified.

Case IV
The substance is liquefied at reduced temperature and increased pressure.  These are also referred to as cryogenic gases.  Examples include:
 liquid nitrogen (LN2)
 liquid hydrogen (LH2)
 liquid oxygen (LOX)
 carbon dioxide (also packaged as a liquefied gas, Case II)

Note: cryogenic gases are typically equipped with some type of 'bleed' device to prevent overpressure from rupturing the bottle and to allow evaporative cooling to continue.

Expansion and volume
The general rule is that one unit volume of liquid will expand to approximately 800 unit volumes of gas at Standard temperature and pressure with some variation due to intermolecular force and molecule size compared to an ideal gas. An ideal gas pressurised to 200 bar in a cylinder would contain 200 times as much as the volume of the cylinder at atmospheric pressure, but real gases will contain less than that by a few percent. At higher pressures, the shortfall is greater.

Special handling considerations
Because the contents are under high pressure and are sometimes hazardous, there are special safety regulations for handling bottled gases. These include chaining bottles to prevent falling and breaking, proper ventilation to prevent injury or death in case of leaks and signage to indicate the potential hazards.

In the United States, the Compressed Gas Association (CGA) sells a number of booklets and pamphlets on safe handling and use of bottled gases.  (Members of the CGA can get the pamphlets for free.) The European Industrial Gases Association and the British Compressed Gases Association provide similar facilities in Europe and the United Kingdom.

Nomenclature differences
In the United States, 'bottled gas' typically refers to liquefied petroleum gas. 'Bottled gas' is sometimes used in medical supply, especially for portable oxygen tanks. Packaged industrial gases are frequently called 'cylinder gas', though 'bottled gas' is sometimes used.

The United Kingdom and other parts of Europe more commonly refer to 'bottled gas' when discussing any usage whether industrial, medical or liquefied petroleum. However, in contrast, what the United States calls liquefied petroleum gas is known generically in the United Kingdom as 'LPG'; and it may be ordered using by one of several Trade names, or specifically as butane or propane depending on the required heat output.

Colour coding
Different countries have different gas colour codes but attempts are being made to standardise the colours of cylinder shoulders:
 Colours of cylinders for Medical gases are covered by an International Organization for Standardization (ISO) standard, ISO 32; but not all countries use this standard.
 Within Europe gas cylinders colours are being standardised according to EN 1089-3, the standard colours applying to the cylinder shoulder only; i.e., the top of the cylinder close to the pillar valve.
 In the United States, colour-coding is not regulated by law.

The user should not rely on the colour of a cylinder to indicate what it contains. The label or decal should always be checked for product identification.

European cylinder colours
The colours below are specific shades, defined in the European Standard in terms of RAL coordinates. The requirements are based on a combination of a few named gases, otherwise on the primary hazard associated with the gas contents:

Specific gases

Based on gas properties

Gas mixtures, mostly for diving
Diving cylinders are left unpainted (for aluminium), or painted to prevent corrosion (for steel), often in bright colors, most often fluorescent yellow, to increase visibility. This should not be confused with industrial gases, where a yellow shoulder means chlorine.

See also

References

Notes

Standards 
 ISO 32: Gas cylinders for medical use—Marking for identification of content.
 CEN EN 1089-3: Transportable gas cylinders, Part 3 - Colour Coding.

External links
 Virtual Anesthesia Machine - 6 different color codes for medical gas cylinders, hoses and outlets
 British Compressed Gases Association – Colour Coding of Cylinders.
 Air Products – European Gas Cylinder Identification Chart.
 Compressed Gas Association (U.S.)
 Gases and Welding Distributors Association (U.S.)
 European Industrial Gases Association (E.U.)
 British Compressed Gases Association (UK)

Anesthesia
Gases
Welding
Breathing gases
Pressure vessels
Gas technologies
Industrial gases
Fuel containers
de:Gasflasche